Richard Oldham may refer to:

 Richard Oldham (bishop) (died 1485/86), bishop of Sodor and Man
 Richard Oldham (priest) (1814–1889), Scottish Episcopalian priest
 Richard Dixon Oldham (1858–1936), British geologist